Roman Danylovych (c. 1230 – c. 1261), Prince of Black Ruthenia (Navahradak) 1254–1258, Prince of Slonim?.

He was born as a younger son of Danylo of Halych, a powerful prince of lands east from Poland and later king of those regions, which was most of the times called Volhynia or Ruthenia (roughly, near modern Belarus and Ukraine). His mother was Anna Mstislavna of Novgorod, daughter of Mstislav the Bold (died before 1252).

In 1252 he was married to Gertrude, Duchess of Austria as her third husband. He, in Western Europe, participated in her attempts to get the power in her duchy, under rivaling claimants. However, already next year they ended up in divorce and Roman returned to Ruthenia where he was 1254-58 Prince of Navahradak.

Marriage and issue
Roman was married twice:
Gertrude of Austria (born c. 1223 - died c. 1288 or died 24 April 1299), married 27 June 1252 (divorced  1253)
Elena Hlibivna of Volkovysk (born after 1288), married c. 1255

He had the following issue:
Vasylko Romanovych (born c. 1256, died after 1282) [2m.], Prince of Slonim; he may (or may not) have been grandfather of Prince Daniel Ostrozky
Mikhailo Romanovych [parentage uncertain], Prince of Drutsk; his alleged descendants include Princes Drutski, Drutskoy-Sokolinski, Konoplya-Sokolinski, Drutski-Ozeretski, Drutski-Prikhabski, Babichev, Drutski-Lubetski, Drutski-Gorski, and Putyatin.
Maria Romanivna [1m.], married Joachim, son of Baron Stefan of Zagreb
Maria, married Prince of Turov Yaroslav Yuriyovych

External links
 Monomakh branch (Volhynia) at Izbornik

Romanovichi family
Rostislavichi family (Smolensk)
Year of birth uncertain